The 1968–69 ABA season was the second season of the Denver Nuggets. They ended their season with one less win compared to last season, but ended up in the playoffs once again. Out of the 11 ABA teams that season the Rockets were ranked second in offensive rating.

Roster

Season standings

Eastern Division

Western Division

Game log
 1968-69 Denver Rockets Schedule and Results | Basketball-Reference.com

Statistics

Playoffs
Western Division Semi-finals

Awards and records
 ABA All-Stars: Larry Jones, Byron Beck, Wayne Hightower
 ABA All-League Team: Larry Jones
 League-leading scorer: Larry Jones

Transactions

References

Denver Nuggets seasons
Denver
Denver
Denver